Anton Krenn (18 April 1911 – April 1993) was an Austrian football player who competed in the 1936 Summer Olympics. He was part of the Austrian team, which won the silver medal in the football tournament. He played all four matches as midfielder.

References

External links
Anton Krenn's profile at databaseOlympics.com
Anton Krenn's profile at Sports Reference.com

1911 births
1993 deaths
Austrian footballers
Footballers at the 1936 Summer Olympics
Olympic footballers of Austria
Olympic silver medalists for Austria
Austria international footballers
Olympic medalists in football
Medalists at the 1936 Summer Olympics
Association football midfielders